Skobelevo refers to the following places in Bulgaria:

 Skobelevo, Haskovo Province
 Skobelevo, Lovech Province
 Skobelevo, Plovdiv Province
 Skobelevo, Sliven Province
 Skobelevo, Stara Zagora Province